Donald Honeyman, (29 October 1919 – 1 June 2011) was an American photographer, who worked for Vogue, The Daily Telegraph and The Sunday Times, among other publications.

Honeyman was born in Iowa and attended the University of Iowa, graduating in 1940. He then served as an Army combat cameraman during the Second World War. He married Gitta Sereny in 1948 and moved to London where they raised their two children.

One of his creations was a 1968 solarized poster published by Athena (retailer) of Alberto Korda's famous photograph of Che Guevara, Guerrillero Heroico.

References

American photographers
American emigrants to the United Kingdom
University of Iowa alumni
1919 births
2011 deaths
United States Army personnel of World War II